Mission San Juan Bautista may refer to any of the following missions, all of which are named for John the Baptist:
Mission San Juan Bautista, in San Juan Bautista, California, United States
Misión San Juan Bautista Malibat, near Loreto, Baja California Sur, Mexico
Mission San Juan Bautista (Mexico), in Guerrero, Coahuila, Mexico